The Alexander-Schaer House is a historic house at 13219 United States Route 70, a short way east of Galloway, Arkansas.  It is a two-story frame structure, with a gabled tile roof and brick veneer exterior.  Built in 1920, it is a fine example of Mission/Spanish Revival architecture, with the tile roof, brick exterior, and decorative ironwork elements all hallmarks of the style.  The house is shaded by ancient oaks and a pecan grove overlooking the cypress waters of Hill Lake. The house's design has been attributed to both John Parks Almand (who did work for Lucy Alexander Schaer's family) or Charles L. Thompson, who did work for other members of the Schaer family.

The Alexander Schaer House has effectively been an event space since 1920 by the original owners, Fred and Lucy Alexander-Schaer, a Little Rock socialite. The Schaer House was listed on the  National Register of Historic Places in 2007.

See also
National Register of Historic Places listings in Pulaski County, Arkansas

References

Houses on the National Register of Historic Places in Arkansas
Mission Revival architecture in Arkansas
Houses completed in 1920
Houses in Pulaski County, Arkansas